Searsia crenata, previously known as Rhus crenata,  ("dune crow-berry"), is a species of Searsia that is native to South Africa, where it grows in frost-free and light frost areas, especially on beach sand dunes.

Description

It is a multibranched evergreen shrub or small tree, reaching a height of 3 metres and a similar spread.

The leaf stalks (petioles) are about 2 mm in length. Each leaflet is obovate-cuneate with three distinct bumps at the broad tip (tricrenate).

The small flowers are produced in autumn, and are followed by dark blue fruit eaten by birds.

Distribution
This species is found along the southern coast of South Africa, from Cape Town as far east as the Kei river. 
Its favoured habitat is stabilised sand dunes.

Cultivation
The tree is a good subject for bonsai, and can easily be pruned into a very neat hedge. It enjoys full sun and is semi frost hardy.

References

crenata
Endemic flora of South Africa
Flora of the Cape Provinces
Fynbos
Garden plants of Southern Africa